"Pola" is a Polish-language indie pop and rock single performed by Muniek Staszczyk. The lyrics were written by Dawid Podsiadło, and the music was composed and produced by Bartosz Dziedzic. The song was released as a single on 3 June 2019 by Agora label company, and later appeared on the Syn miasta album which was released on 18 November 2019. The title "Pola" is an allegory to Poland and its political and social situation in the early 21st century. The song had reached first place on various charts in Poland and was awarded a platinum certification.

The music video of the song was written and directed by Katarzyna Sobczyk, with Agata Buzek performing the role of Pola.

Charts

Certifications

References 

2019 songs
2019 singles
Polish-language songs
Protest songs
Political songs
Anti-fascist music
Songs about Poland